Tortyra is a genus of moths in the family Choreutidae.

Species
Tortyra aenescens (Dognin, 1905)
Tortyra argentifascia Walsingham, 1914
Tortyra auriferalis Walker, 1863
Tortyra aurofasciana (Snellen, 1875)
Tortyra cantharodes Meyrick, 1922
Tortyra caracasiae Amsel, 1956-1957
Tortyra chalcobathra Meyrick, 1922
Tortyra chalcodes Walsingham, 1914
Tortyra cuprinella Busck, 1914
Tortyra ferratella Busck, 1914
Tortyra fulgens (C. Felder, R. Felder & Rogenhofer, 1875)
Tortyra hoguella Heppner, 1981
Tortyra hyalozona Meyrick, 1912
Tortyra ignita (Zeller, 1877)
Tortyra iocyaneus Heppner, 1991
Tortyra malacozona Meyrick, 1922
Tortyra orphnophanes Meyrick, 1932
Tortyra rhodoclaena Meyrick, 1930
Tortyra slossonia (Fernald, 1900)
Tortyra spectabilis Walker, 1863
Tortyra sporodelta Meyrick, 1922
Tortyra violacea (C. Felder, R. Felder & Rogenhofer, 1875)
Tortyra vividis Busck, 1934

External links
choreutidae.lifedesks.org

 
Choreutidae